Cardepia sociabilis is a species of moth of the family Noctuidae. It is found from Morocco to Chad through southern Europe, Turkey, Israel, Syria, the Arabian Peninsula to India.

Adults are on wing from March to November. There are multiple generations per year.

The larvae feed on various halophilous plants.

Subspecies
Cardepia sociabilis socialis
Cardepia sociabilis deserticola (Syria)
Cardepia sociabilis mauretanica (Algeria)
Cardepia sociabilis canescens
Cardepia sociabilis rajasthana

References

External links 

Lepiforum.de

Hadenini
Moths of Europe
Moths of Africa
Moths of Asia
Moths described in 1850